Shahida Mini, also known as Mini (Punjabi) is a Pakistani film actress and singer. She runs her own production house called SM Production.

Early life
Shahida Mini was born on 1972 in Lahore, Pakistan. She completed her studies from University of Lahore.

Career
Shahida started singing at age 10. Shahida parents encouraged her to sing and she started to sing at Radio Pakistan. Shahida began her career as a child artist and made her debut as an actress in Punjabi movie Jahez. She appeared in movies Insaf Ka Tarazo, Achha Shookar Wala, Dushman Dada, Damto Zor and Taubaa. Shahida also appeared in movies Chahat, Dil Lagi, Nargis and Dehleez. She also appeared on television in dramas Qafas and Manjhdaar. For her contributions towards the film and television industry, she was honored by the Government of Pakistan with the Pride of Performance in 2013.

Personal life
Shahida Mini is married. She has one daughter named Mehreen Atta. Shahida's daughter is married to actor Fahad Shaikh.

Filmography

Television

Film

Awards and recognition
 Nigar Award for Best Supporting actress in 1992
 Bolan Award in 1995
 PTV National Award for Best Singer of the Year 2002
 Graduate Award in 2003
 Asian Melody Queen Award in 2006
 PTV Prime Award UK in 2008
 Lifetime Achievement Award by the President of Pakistan in 2012
 Pride of Performance Award by the President of Pakistan in 2013

References

External links
 
 

1972 births
Living people
20th-century Pakistani women singers
20th-century Pakistani actresses
21st-century Pakistani actresses
21st-century Pakistani women singers
Actresses from Lahore
Pakistani film actresses
Pakistani television actresses
Pakistani women singers
Punjabi people
Nigar Award winners
PTV Award winners
Recipients of the Pride of Performance